The Serra Nova State Park  is a state park in the state of Minas Gerais, Brazil.
It protects an area of rugged terrain with considerable diversity of flora and fauna.

Location

It covers parts of the Serra Geral and Espinhaço Mountains, and has rugged terrain.
It lies on the divide between the São Francisco River basin and the Jequitinhonha River basin.
The Mosquito River cuts through the Serra do Talhado.
Several springs rise in the park, including sources of the São Gonçalo stream and the Ventania, Suçuarana, Bomba, Ladim and Córrego da Velha rivers.

History

In 2008 IEF held public consultations on expanding the park to include the Serra do Talhado, and renaming the park to the Serra Nova and Talhado State Park.
Work on the management plan for the expanded park was scheduled to start in 2010.
This would include a survey of flora and fauna, defining infrastructure needs including a guard house, administrative headquarters, restrooms and so on.
The park could then be opened to the public.

Environment

The park protects part of the Espinhaço Complex ecosystem, which is threatened by agriculture.
The park's vegetation is mainly rupestrian fields, with some native trees such as Jataipeba, Aroeira and Sucupira. 
There are some areas of closed forest.
Vegetation includes cerrado, rocky meadows and dry forest.

Fauna include cougar (Puma concolor), crab-eating fox (Cerdocyon thous), maned wolf (Chrysocyon brachyurus), ferrets, tufted capuchin (Sapajus apella), southern tamandua (Tamandua tetradactyla), helmeted manakin (Antilophia galeata), hummingbirds, salamanders and snakes such as boa constrictor (Boa constrictor), rattlesnakes, coral snake (Micrurus lemniscatus) and Bothrops jararacussu.
In 2007 researchers from the PUC Minas observed 27 species of amphibians, including one that is probably new to science.

Visiting

As of 2017 the park was open to visitors from 8:00 to 17:00 daily.
Attractions include the Cachoeira do Serrado, Poço do Jacaré, Escorregador and Poço da Sereia waterfalls and pools.
Prohibited activities included making sound recordings, practicing extreme sports such as abseiling, ziplining or climbing, bringing domestic animals, using chemical products for bathing or washing, hunting and fishing, collecting rocks, plants or animals, making fires and camping inside the park.
Visitors are advised to stick to well marked trails, preferably in the company of a local guide, and to stay away from watercourses at the first sign of rain.

Notes

Sources

State parks of Brazil
Protected areas established in 2003
2003 establishments in Brazil
Protected areas of Minas Gerais